Clix is a miniatures wargaming system developed by WizKids. It is characterized by the use of a dial wheel in the base of miniature figurines. The dial can be turned to reveal hidden information, representing the changing statistics of the figurine as the game progresses. This has been rebranded into the Combat Dial System by WizKids.

Clix games include:
Creepy Freaks
Crimson Skies
Halo ActionClix
HeroClix
DC HeroClix
Marvel HeroClix
Indy HeroClix
Alien vs. Predator Heroclix
The BPRD and Hellboy HeroClix
City of Heroes HeroClix
City of Villains HeroClix
Invincible HeroClix
Gears of War HeroClix
Iron Maiden HeroClix
The Lord of the Rings HeroClix
Street Fighter HeroClix
Star Trek HeroClix
Yu-Gi-Oh! HeroClix
HorrorClix
Mage Knight
MechWarrior
MechWarrior: Dark Age
MechWarrior: Age of Destruction
Shadowrun Duels
SportsClix
Star Trek: Attack Wing
MLB SportsClix
ToonClix

Clix (miniatures) games
Miniature wargames
WizKids games